San Onofre or Santo Onofre may refer to:

 Onuphrius, known as San Onofre in Spanish and Santo Onofre in Portuguese, 4th-century Egyptian hermit honored as a saint in the Roman Catholic Church
 San Onofre, Sucre, a municipality in the Sucre Department of Colombia
 San Onofre State Beach, located in San Diego County, California
 San Onofre Nuclear Generating Station (SONGS), a nuclear power plant adjacent to the state beach